Eslamabad Rural District is in Eslamabad District of Parsabad County, Ardabil province, Iran. According to the censuses of 2006 and 2011, its constituent villages were a part of the former Qeshlaq-e Shomali Rural District of the Central District. As of the most recent census of 2016, the population of the rural district was 4,218 in 1,212 households, by which time Eslamabad District had been established with two rural districts. The largest of its 10 villages was Eslamabad-e Jadid, with 1,585 people.

References 

Parsabad County

Rural Districts of Ardabil Province

Populated places in Ardabil Province

Populated places in Parsabad County

fa:دهستان اسلام‌آباد (پارس‌آباد)